Patrica A. Owens (born 1941) was the mayor of Grand Forks, North Dakota during the flood that devastated the city in April 1997. She actively lobbied then-president Bill Clinton for funds to rebuild the city and construct a permanent flood protection system for the city and neighboring East Grand Forks, Minnesota.

Political career
Owens, born in 1941 in East Grand Forks, Minnesota, worked as the mayor's executive assistant for 33 years, before running for mayor herself in 1996. She received 76% of the vote and became Grand Forks' first female mayor. Then in 1997, after less than one year as mayor, the city was struck by the 1997 Red River Flood. She received numerous awards and national recognition for her efforts after the flood. She ran for a second term in 2000, but was defeated by Michael Brown. Also in 2000, Owens was a member of the Mayors' Campaign Against Breast Cancer.

Retirement
Owens currently resides in Ocala, Florida, where she moved in 2001. That same year, she was awarded an honorary Doctor of Letters degree from the University of North Dakota. In 2004 when Florida was struck by a string of hurricanes, she was asked by the Federal Emergency Management Agency (FEMA) to act as an ambassador for them by trying to help give the victims some sort of hope. However, she was unable to as the retirement development had been damaged by two of the hurricanes that hit the state.

See also
List of mayors of Grand Forks, North Dakota
1997 Red River Flood in the United States

References

External links
 FLOOD AFTERMATH (APRIL 30, 1997)

1941 births
Living people
People from East Grand Forks, Minnesota
Mayors of Grand Forks, North Dakota
Women mayors of places in the United States
Women in North Dakota politics
20th-century American politicians
20th-century American women politicians
21st-century American women